General Sir William Fenwick Williams, 1st Baronet  (4 December 180026 July 1883) was a Nova Scotian military leader for the British during the Victorian era.

Williams is remembered for his defence of the town of Kars during the Crimean War. He with other British officers inspired the poorly equipped Turkish soldiers to repel Russian attacks by General Murav’ev on the besieged town for three months, causing 6,000 Russian casualties. They were forced to surrender due to starvation, disease and shortage of ammunition. However, they surrendered on their own terms, with the officers being allowed to retain their swords. Williams was imprisoned at Ryazan, but he was treated very well and released at the end of the Crimean War in 1856. Before returning home he was introduced to Tsar Alexander II.

Many other honours were bestowed upon Williams, and in 1865–1867, he was appointed the first Lieutenant Governor of Nova Scotia, where he was born.

Early life

He was born in Annapolis Royal, Nova Scotia, the second son of Commissary-General Thomas Williams, barrack-master at Halifax, Nova Scotia, Canada. He was, however, widely rumoured to be the natural son of Prince Edward, Duke of Kent and Strathearn; this would make him Queen Victoria's half-brother. Williams never denied this, but it is not thought to be true.

Career

Williams was educated at the Royal Military Academy in Woolwich. He entered the Royal Artillery as second lieutenant in 1825. His services were lent to Turkey in 1841, and he was employed as a captain in the arsenal at Constantinople. He was British commissioner in the conferences preceding the treaty of Erzurum in 1847, and again in the settlement of the Ottoman-Iranian boundary in 1848. He was appointed CB in 1852.

Crimean War 

Promoted colonel, he was British commissioner with the Turkish army in Anatolia in the Crimean War (Russian War) of 1854–56, and, having been made a pasha (general/governor/lord) with the degree of ferik (major-general), he commanded the Turkish troops at the defence of the town of Kars during the Crimean War. He with other British officers inspired the poorly equipped Turkish soldiers to repel Russian attacks by General Murav’ev on the besieged town for three months causing 6,000 Russian casualties. They were forced to surrender due to starvation, disease and shortage of ammunition. However, they surrendered on their own terms, with the officers being allowed to retain their swords. Williams was imprisoned at Ryazan but he was treated very well and released at the end of the Crimean War in 1856. Before returning home he was introduced to Tsar Alexander II.

Williams had put up such an honourable defence of the city that Murav’ev stated: "General Williams, you have made yourself a name in history, and posterity will stand amazed at the endurance, courage and the discipline which the siege has called forth in the remains of the army."

A baronetcy with pension for life, the KCB, the grand cross of the Legion of Honour and of the Order of the Medjidie, the freedom of the City of London with a sword of honour, and the honorary degree of DCL of Oxford University, were the distinctions conferred upon him.

Promoted major-general in November 1855 on his return from captivity in Russia, he held the Woolwich command, and represented the borough of Calne in parliament from 1856 to 1859. In the lead up to the American Civil War, from 1859 to 1864, he held the position of Commander-in-Chief, North America, and was responsible for preparations for war with the United States in the case that relations broke down. The most severe strain in relations occurring during the Trent Affair. He was promoted to lieutenant-general and appointed colonel-commandant Royal Artillery in 1864.

Governorships 

He held the governorship of Nova Scotia from 1865 to 1867. After Canadian Confederation in 1867, Williams continued in office as the first Lieutenant Governor of Nova Scotia and the governorship of Gibraltar from September 1870 to 1876. He was advanced to GCB in 1871 and Constable of the Tower of London in 1881.

Later life

He died in a hotel in Pall Mall on 26 July 1883 and he was buried in Brompton Cemetery. The portrait by William Gush was painted for the Parliament House, Halifax, Nova Scotia and hangs to this day in Province House, Halifax.

Legacy 

 namesake of Karsdale, Nova Scotia
The village of Port Williams, Nova Scotia is named in his honour.
The village of Kars, Ontario
Kars Street, Port Williams, Nova Scotia
Fenwick Street, Halifax
Fenwick Tower (Halifax)
Plaque to honour birthplace, Annapolis Royal, Nova Scotia

See also 

 Military history of Nova Scotia

Notes

References

External links
 

       

1800 births
1883 deaths
Williams, William Fenwick, 1st Baronet
Liberal Party (UK) MPs for English constituencies
Canadian people of English descent
Canadian baronets
Canadian knights
British Army generals
British Army personnel of the Crimean War
Governors of Gibraltar
People from Annapolis County, Nova Scotia
Knights Grand Cross of the Order of the Bath
Governors of Nova Scotia
Lieutenant Governors of Nova Scotia
Lord-Lieutenants of the Tower Hamlets
Constables of the Tower of London
Governors of the Colony of Nova Scotia
UK MPs 1852–1857
UK MPs 1857–1859
Burials at Brompton Cemetery
British prisoners of war of the Crimean War